II liga (Druga Liga), currently named eWinner II liga due to sponsorship reasons by eWinner, is a Polish football league that sits at the third tier of the Polish football league system. Until the end of the 2007–08 season II Liga referred to a league at the 2nd tier, although this changed with the formation of the Ekstraklasa as the top level league in Poland. Currently, II liga is below I liga and above III liga.

Since the 2014/15 season there is one group making up the II Liga unlike in previous seasons when there were two groups (West and East). The league consists of 18 teams. Two first teams win promotion to the I Liga. Teams from places 15–18 are demoted to the III Liga. Teams will play 34 league queue after 9 matches (including 306 meetings) in two rounds: autumn and spring.

The top two places in the final table will be rewarded with a promotion to the first division, the teams ranked 3rd to 6th will play in the play-offs for the entrance to the second level. The last four teams will drop to the third division.

Clubs
The following 18 clubs are competing in the II liga during the 2022–23 season.

History
The history of II Liga, or the third level of Polish football system, dates back to the Second Polish Republic. In 1927, the Ekstraklasa, also called State League (Liga Panstwowa) was established. Below the Ekstraklasa, there were several regional A Classes, which in most cases covered the territory of one Voivodeship (see Lower Level Football Leagues in Interwar Poland). Further below, there were B Classes (usually covering two-three counties), and, in the regions with enough football teams, C Classes (covering one county).

On June 29, 1945 in Krakow, officials of the Polish Football Association (PZPN) established three-tier system of regional championships in Poland. The first level was, following the pre-1939 pattern, A Classes, followed by B Classes, and C Classes. This system remained in use until 1951, when in March 1952, it was replaced by four classes, 1st, 2nd, 3rd and 4th. Meanwhile, the number of teams in the second level of Polish tier was reduced from 40 to 14 (March 1953), which meant that as many as 26 teams were automatically relegated to the third level. As a result, there were 93 teams in the third level, divided into 8 groups. Six of these groups covered more than one voivodeship, while two groups (Katowice and Krakow) covered only their provinces, due to the football potential in those regions. After the regular season, 8 winners played each other in two-level playoffs, with two winners winning promotion to the second level.

On February 13, 1955, in Warsaw, Third League was officially formed, with four groups. This idea was abandoned after a month, due to financial reasons. Instead, in 1956, the Regional Leagues were established, with 15 groups. In 1960, Polish football switched from spring-autumn to autumn-spring system. First games of the new system took place on August 19, 1960. 26 February 1966, PZPN decided to reduce the number of groups to 4, with 16 teams in each. The Macroregional League, as it was called at that time, existed in that form until 1973, when Polish football officials decided to reintroduce the Regional Leagues, with 20 groups (since 1974 - 24 groups). In 1976, 8 groups were established, with 112 teams. In 1980, the number of groups was reduced to 4, but in 1982, again 8 groups were established. The system of 8 groups of the third level remained unchanged until 1998, with the exception of 1989/1990, when there were four groups.

The number of third level groups
 1945–1951: 14 (1950: 17)
 1952: 17
 1953–1956: 8 (1956: 9)
 1957–1965/1966: 15 (1958: 16, 1959: 17, 1960: 18)
 1966/1967–1972/1973: 4
 1973/1974–1975/1976: 20 (1974/75: 24)
 1976/1977–1979/1980: 8	
 1980/1981–1981/1982: 4
 1982/1983–1996/1997: 8	
 1997/1998–2007/2008: 4
 2008/2009–2013/2014: 2
 since 2014/2015: 1

See also
 Lower Level Football Leagues in Interwar Poland

References

 
3
Pol
Professional sports leagues in Poland